Stanley Coulter (June 2, 1853 – June 26, 1943) was an American biologist, brother of J. M. Coulter, born at Ningpo, China, and educated at Hanover College.  In 1887 he was appointed professor of biology at Purdue.  His publications include more than 125 pamphlets on nature study, scientific researches, sketches, and also Flora of Indiana (1899), and A Key to the Genera of the Native Forest Trees and Shrubs of Indiana (1907). He was dean of the School of Sciences at Purdue from 1905 until his retirement in 1926. He was married to Lucy Post. His brother was botanist John Merle Coulter.

1853 births
1943 deaths
American biologists
American science writers
Hanover College alumni